List of the National Register of Historic Places listings in Delaware County, New York

This is intended to be a complete list of properties and districts listed on the National Register of Historic Places in Delaware County, New York.  The locations of National Register properties and districts (at least for all showing latitude and longitude coordinates below) may be seen in a map by clicking on "Map of all coordinates". There is just one property in the county which is further designated a National Historic Landmark, the John Burroughs Home.



Current listings

|}

See also

National Register of Historic Places listings in New York
List of New York State Historic Markers in Delaware County, New York

References

Delaware County